David Derby (born May 30, 1976) is an American politician who served in the Oklahoma House of Representatives from the 74th district from 2006 to 2016.

In 2022, David Derby ran for Oklahoma's 2nd congressional district in a 14 candidate Republican primary. He placed eighth in the primary.

Electoral history

References

1976 births
Candidates in the 2022 United States House of Representatives elections
Living people
Republican Party members of the Oklahoma House of Representatives